List of educational institutions in Karachi  may refer to:

List of schools in Karachi
List of colleges in Karachi
List of universities in Karachi

Institutions
Karachi-related lists
Karachi